1 Samuel 8 is the eighth chapter of the First Book of Samuel in the Old Testament of the Christian Bible or the first part of the Books of Samuel in the Hebrew Bible. According to Jewish tradition  the book was attributed to the prophet Samuel, with additions by the prophets Gad and Nathan, but modern scholars view it as a composition of a number of independent texts of various ages from c. 630–540 BCE. This chapter records the request from the elders of Israel to Samuel for a king, part of a section comprising 1 Samuel 7–15 which records the rise of the monarchy in Israel and the account of the first years of King Saul.

Text 
This chapter was originally written in the Hebrew language. It is divided into 22 verses.

Textual witnesses 
Some early manuscripts containing the text of this chapter in Hebrew are of the Masoretic Text tradition, which includes the Codex Cairensis (895), Aleppo Codex (10th century), and Codex Leningradensis (1008). Fragments containing parts of this chapter in Hebrew were found among the Dead Sea Scrolls including 4Q51 (4QSam; 100–50 BCE) with extant verses 7, 9–14, 16–20.

Extant ancient manuscripts of a translation into Koine Greek known as the Septuagint (originally was made in the last few centuries BCE) include Codex Vaticanus (B; B; 4th century) and Codex Alexandrinus (A; A; 5th century).

Places 

Beersheba
Ramah

Analysis 
This chapter records the elders of Israel's request for a king and reports their persistence despite the warning from Samuel regarding the 'oppressive ways of kings'. One reason for the quest for a king was that Samuel's sons were unfit to succeed him (verses 3, 5), because they perverted justice in Beersheba, recalling the behavior of Eli's sons. One more explicit reason was that the people wished to be governed 'like other nations' (cf. Deuteronomy 17:14) with supposedly better military advantages (verse 20), than a new line of judges.

The antimonarchial stance was given in three different sections of this chapter:
 the proposal displeased Samuel and was regarded by YHWH as a rejection of himself, instead of Samuel (verses  6–9)
 Samuel gave a negative view of 'the ways of the king' (verses 10–17), such as the conscription of personnel for military duties (verses 11–12a) and for labor (verse 12b–13), the confiscation of property and provisions for maintaining a court (verses 14–15), and the confiscation of stock (verse 16, reading 'cattle' with LXX in preference to 'young men' in the MT). Akkadian texts from Ras Shamra testify to many of the practices listed in verses 11–17. The practice was listed during Solomon's reign in 1 Kings 10–11.
 The kingship was reluctantly permitted, tolerated rather than approved (cf. verse 7), because of Israel's determination (verses 19–21).
The narrative further harmonized two opposing views: (1) the monarchy was not approved by YHWH, but (2) YHWH himself was responsible for selecting the first kings of Israel.

Samuel's sons (8:1–3) 
When Samuel was at old age (verse 1), his sons, who were appointed as judges, became corrupt (verse 2). This draws a parallel to Samuel's mentor, Eli, whose sons became corrupt at Eli's old age (1 Samuel 2:22), leading to prophetic judgments on the his family, Israel's defeat and loss of ark to the Philistines (1 Samuel 4). In the case of Samuel, the corruption of his sons led to the elders of Israel requesting for a king.

Verse 2 
Now the name of his firstborn was Joel; and the name of his second, Abiah: they were judges in Beersheba.
Cross reference: 
"Beersheba": located on the southernmost frontier of Judah, implying the recovery of the territory from the Philistines (1 Samuel 7:14). The placement of Samuel's sons here is supported by the writing of Josephus (from 1st century CE).

The demand for a king (8:4–22) 
The elders of Israel point to the corrupt ways of Samuel's sons and Samuel's old age as reasons to have a king like all 'other nations' (verse 5), contrary to God's declaration that Israel is 'about all the nations' (Deuteronomy 26:19) because they have YHWH as their king. This has once been brought out in Judges 8, when people asked Gideon to rule over them, but Gideon declined by saying that "the Lord will rule over you" (Judges 8:23). Samuel was deeply offended by the request, as verse 6 states the request "displeased" him (in Hebrew: 'this thing is evil in Samuel's eye'), because the request in Hebrew was literally for "a king to judge them", thereby attacking his lifelong role (and of his sons'). When Samuel 'prayed to the Lord' (that is, 'he laid the matter before the Lord in prayer'),  God assured Samuel that the people did not reject Samuel personally but rejecting God's kingship over them. God did not seem surprised nor offended, instead quickly agreed to give the people a human king (verse 7), while explaining to Samuel that this behavior was consistent ever since God delivered the people in Exodus from Egypt until that time, in which the people tend to forsake God for false gods (verse 8). In fact, the Torah already anticipated and prepared specific instructions for this occasion (Deuteronomy 17:14–15).

Verse 7 
And the Lord said to Samuel, "Heed the voice of the people in all that they say to you; for they have not rejected you, but they have rejected Me, that I should not reign over them."
"Should not reign over them": that is, the people did not even want a theocratic king, whose first duty would be to maintain the Torah (Deuteronomy 17:18, 19).

See also 

Related Bible parts: Judges 8, 1 Samuel 2, 1 Samuel 3, 1 Samuel 7

Notes

References

Sources

Commentaries on Samuel

General

External links 
 Jewish translations:
 Shmuel I – I Samuel – Chapter 8 (Judaica Press). Hebrew text and English translation [with Rashi's commentary] at Chabad.org
 Christian translations:
 Online Bible at GospelHall.org (ESV, KJV, Darby, American Standard Version, Bible in Basic English)
 1 Samuel chapter 8. Bible Gateway

08